Fábio Duca Gurgel do Amaral (born 18 January 1970 in Rio de Janeiro, Brazil) is a former Mixed martial arts fighter and 7th degree coral belt Brazilian jiu-jitsu practitioner and coach.

One of the best jiu-jitsu competitors of his generation, Gurgel is a 4-time  World Jiu-Jitsu Champion (1996–2001), Brazilian National champion and European Open champion. Gurgel is the co-founder of the Alliance Jiu Jitsu team,  president of the Professional League of Jiu-Jitsu, and is regarded as one of the top coaches in Brazilian jiu-jitsu.

Biography 
Fábio Duca Gurgel do Amaral was born on 18 January 1970 in Rio de Janeiro, Brazil. He started practicing Brazilian Jiu-Jitsu (BJJ) at the age of 13, receiving his black belt at the age of 19 from Romero "Jacaré" Cavalcanti. Along with Cavalcanti he co-founded Alliance Jiu Jitsu Team.
Gurgel is the teacher of BJJ and ADCC World Champion Marcelo Garcia. He is also President of the Professional League of Jiu-Jitsu.

Brazilian Jiu Jitsu 
Awards and achievements:
1986 – Awarded purple belt
1988 – Awarded brown belt
1989 – Awarded black belt
1993 – Founded Alliance
1994 – Brazilian National Champion
1995 – Brazilian National Champion, Pan-Am Champion
1996 – Brazilian National Champion, World Champion
1997 – World Champion
1999 – Brazilian National Champion
2000 – World Champion
2001 – World Champion
2007 – European Champion
2008 – Awarded 5th Degree black belt by CBJJ, Pan-Am Champion
2009 – European Champion
2010 – European Champion
2013 – Awarded 6th Degree black belt
2020 – Awarded 7th Degree red and black belt

Instructor Lineage 
Mitsuyo "Count Koma" Maeda → Carlos Gracie, Sr. → Helio Gracie → Rolls Gracie → Romero "Jacare" Cavalcanti → Fabio Gurgel

Books 
Brazilian Jiu-Jitsu Advanced Techniques (2007)
Brazilian Jiu-Jitsu Basic Techniques (2007)

Mixed martial arts record 

|-
|Loss
|align=center|3–2
|Mark Kerr
|Decision (unanimous)
|rowspan=3|World Vale Tudo Championship 3
|rowspan=3|January 19, 1997
|align=center|1
|align=center|30:00
|rowspan=3|Brazil
|
|-
|Win
|align=center|3–1
|Michael Pacholik
|TKO (submission to punches)
|align=center|1
|align=center|4:50
|
|-
|Win
|align=center|2–1
|Patrick Smith
|TKO (retirement)
|align=center|1
|align=center|0:50
|
|-
|Loss
|align=center|1–1
|Jerry Bohlander
|Decision (unanimous)
|UFC 11
|September 20, 1996
|align=center|1
|align=center|15:00
|Augusta, Georgia
|
|-
|Win
|align=center|1–0
|Denilson Maia
|TKO (submission to punches)
|Desafio: Jiu-Jitsu vs. Luta Livre
|September 26, 1991
|align=center|1
|align=center|9:55
|Rio de Janeiro, Brazil
|
|}

See also 
List of Brazilian Jiu-Jitsu practitioners

References

External links 
Fabio Gurgel
Alliance Jiu Jitsu
Fabio Gurgel BJJ Heroes
 
 

Sportspeople from Rio de Janeiro (city)
1970 births
Living people
Brazilian male writers
Brazilian practitioners of Brazilian jiu-jitsu
Brazilian submission wrestlers
Brazilian male mixed martial artists
Mixed martial artists utilizing Brazilian jiu-jitsu
People awarded a coral belt in Brazilian jiu-jitsu
Ultimate Fighting Championship male fighters
World Brazilian Jiu-Jitsu Championship medalists
IBJJF Hall of Fame inductees
Brazilian jiu-jitsu practitioners who have competed in MMA (men)